Moro United F.C. is a Tanzanian football club based in Morogoro.

They last played in the top level of Tanzanian professional football, the Tanzanian Premier League, during the 2011/12 season.

Their home games are played at Jamhuri Stadium.

Performance in CAF competitions
CAF Confederation Cup: 1 appearance
2006 – Intermediate Round

References

Football clubs in Tanzania
Morogoro